In quantum information theory, the Wehrl entropy, named after Alfred Wehrl, is a classical entropy of a quantum-mechanical density matrix. It is a type of quasi-entropy defined for the Husimi Q representation of the phase-space quasiprobability distribution. See  for a comprehensive review of basic properties of classical, quantum and Wehrl entropies, and their implications in statistical mechanics.

Definitions 
The Husimi function is a "classical phase-space" function of position  and momentum , and in one dimension is defined for any quantum-mechanical density matrix  by 

where  is a "(Glauber) coherent state", given by

(It can be understood as the Weierstrass transform of the Wigner quasi-probability distribution.)

The Wehrl entropy is then defined as
 
The definition can be easily generalized to any finite dimension.

Properties 
Such a definition of the entropy relies on the fact that the Husimi Q representation remains non-negative definite, unlike other representations of quantum quasiprobability distributions in phase space. The Wehrl entropy has several important properties: 
 It is always positive,  like the full quantum von Neumann entropy, but unlike the classical differential entropy which can be negative at low temperature. In fact, the minimum value of the Wehrl entropy is 1, i.e.  as discussed below in the section "Werhl's conjecture".  
 The entropy for the tensor product of two systems is always greater than the entropy of one system. In other words, for a state  on a Hilbert space , we have , where . Note that the quantum von Neumann entropy, does not have this property, as can be clearly seen for a pure maximally entangled state. 
 The Wehrl entropy is strictly lower bounded by a von Neumann entropy, . There is no known upper or lower bound (other than zero) for the difference .  
 The Wehrl entropy is not invariant under all unitary transformations, unlike the von Neumann entropy. In other words,  for a general unitary . It is, however, invariant under certain unitary transformations.

Wehrl's conjecture 
.

Soon after the conjecture was posted, E. H. Lieb proved  that the minimum of the Wehrl entropy is 1, and it occurs when the state is a projector onto any coherent state.

In 1991 E. Carlen proved  the uniqueness of the minimizer, i.e. the minimum of the Wehrl entropy occurs only when the state is a projector onto any coherent state.

The analog of the Wehrl conjecture for systems with a classical phase space isomorphic to the sphere (rather than the plane) is the Lieb conjecture.

Discussion 
However, it is not the fully quantum von Neumann entropy in the Husimi representation in phase space, :   all the requisite  star-products ★ in that entropy have been dropped here. In the Husimi representation, the star products read
 
and are isomorphic to the Moyal products of the Wigner–Weyl representation.

The Wehrl entropy, then, may be thought of as a type of heuristic semiclassical approximation to the full quantum von Neumann entropy, since it retains some  dependence (through Q) but not all of it.

Like all entropies, it reflects some measure of non-localization, as the Gauss transform involved in generating  and the sacrifice of the star operators have effectively discarded information. In general, as indicated, for the same state, the Wehrl entropy exceeds the von Neumann entropy (which vanishes for pure states).

Wehrl entropy for Bloch coherent states 
Wehrl entropy can be defined for other kinds of coherent states. For example, it can be defined for Bloch coherent states, that is, for angular momentum representations of the group  for quantum spin systems.

Bloch coherent states 
We consider a single quantum spin of fixed angular momentum , and shall denote by  the usual angular momentum operators that satisfy the following commutation relations:  and cyclic permutations.

Denote the unit sphere in three dimensions by 
, 
.

The Bloch coherent state is defined by 
.

Taking into account the above properties of the state , the Bloch coherent state can also be expressed as

where , and 
 
is a normalised eigenstate of  satisfying .

The Bloch coherent state is an eigenstate of the rotated angular momentum operator  with a maximum eigenvalue. In other words, for a rotation operator 
, 
the Bloch coherent state  satisfies 
.

Wehrl entropy for Bloch coherent states 
Given a density matrix   , define the semi-classical density distribution 
. 
,
where  is a classical differential entropy.

Wehrl's conjecture for Bloch coherent states 
It suggests the minimum value of the Werhl entropy for Bloch coherent states, 
,  
and states that the minimum is reached if and only if the state is a pure Bloch coherent state.

In 2012 E. H. Lieb and J. P. Solovej proved  a substantial part of this conjecture, confirming the minimum value of the Wehrl entropy for Bloch coherent states, and the fact that it is reached for any pure Bloch coherent state. The problem of the uniqueness of the minimizer remains unresolved.

Generalized Wehrl's conjecture 
In  E. H. Lieb and J. P. Solovej proved Wehrl's conjecture for Bloch coherent states by generalizing it in the following manner.

Generalized Wehrl's conjecture 
For any concave function  (e.g.  as in the definition of the Wehrl entropy), and any density matrix , we have
,
where 0 is a pure coherent state defined in the section "Wehrl conjecture".

Generalized Wehrl's conjecture for Bloch coherent states 
Generalized Wehrl's conjecture for Glauber coherent states was proved as a consequence of the similar statement for Bloch coherent states. For any concave function , and any density matrix  we have
,
where  is any point on a sphere.

The uniqueness of the minimizers for either statement remains an open problem.

See also 
 Coherent state
 Entropy
 Information theory and measure theory
 Lieb conjecture
 Quantum information
 Quantum mechanics
 Spin
 Statistical mechanics
 Von Neumann entropy

References 

Quantum mechanical entropy
Mathematical physics
Quantum mechanics